The Federation of Free Trade Unions in Austria was a trade union centre in Austria.

The federation was established in 1928, when the Imperial Trade Union Commission was refounded on an industrial union basis.  It had 38 affiliates, with a total of 655,000 members, and was led by Anton Hueber.

In February 1934, the federation was banned by the Nazi government.

Affiliates included:
 Austrian Construction Union
 Austrian Metalworkers' Union (merged into Austrian Metal and Mineworkers' Union in 1931)
 Austrian Senefelder Union
 Central Association of Commercial Employees of Austria
 Reich Association of Austrian Printing and Newspaper Workers
 Union of Artificial Flower and Decorative Feather Workers of Austria
 Union of Austrian Woodworkers
 Union of Bookbinders and Paper Workers of Austria
 Union of Cardboard Box Workers of Austria
 Union of Carpenters of Austria
 Union of Decorators, House Painters, Varnishers and Related Professions of Austria
 Union of Domestic Assistants, Educators and Homeworkers
 Union of Furriers and Related Trades of Austria
 Union of Hairdressers' Assistants of Austria
 Union of Hat Makers of Austria
 Union and Legal Protection Association for Austrian Railway Personnel
 Union of Office Assistants in Industry in Austria
 Union of Stoneworkers
 Union of Tailors of Austria
 Union of Textile Workers of Austria
 Union of Workers in the Chemical Industry of Austria

References

Trade unions in Austria
National federations of trade unions
Trade unions established in 1928
Trade unions disestablished in 1934